Aksys Games Localization, Inc. is a video game publisher that specializes in translating and localizing Japanese video games for English-speaking markets. It was founded by Akibo Shieh in 2006. Some of its clients include Bandai Namco Games, Xseed Games, and Atlus USA. Aksys Games is best known for its involvement in the Guilty Gear series. It has become a full-fledged game publisher with the announcement of Eagle Eye Golf for PlayStation 2, and has expressed a desire to publish for all current platforms from Microsoft, Nintendo, and Sony.

The company's name is coincidentally similar to Arc System Works, with whom it has a partnership. Despite their similar names, and the partnership between them, neither company owns the other. Aksys Games publishes many games for Arc System Works in North America, and has even assisted the latter in releasing the Bit.Trip series in Japan.

Aksys is also the North American distributor for the European publisher Rising Star Games. In addition, Aksys localized Nihon Falcom's role-playing game Tokyo Xanadu for the American market in 2017.

Video games

Console games

PlayStation 2

PlayStation 3

PlayStation 4

Wii

Wii U

Nintendo Switch

Xbox 360

Xbox One

Portable games

Nintendo DS

Nintendo 3DS

PlayStation Portable

PlayStation Vita

iOS

PC games

Microsoft Windows

References

External links

2006 establishments in California
Companies based in Torrance, California
American companies established in 2006
Video game companies established in 2006
Video game companies of the United States
Video game publishers
Video game localization